Kristiansen is a Danish and Norwegian patronymic surname. For etymology - see Christiansen 

Celine Lundbye Kristiansen, Danish handball player
Egil Kristiansen, Norwegian cross country skier
Einar Kristiansen, Norwegian Nordic skiing athlete
Einstein Kristiansen,  Norwegian cartoonist, designer, TV-host 
Elin Kristiansen, Norwegian biathlete
Erling Kristiansen (chess player), Norwegian chess master
Fredrik Kristiansen, co-creator of the Blink online community
Gro Marit Istad Kristiansen,  Norwegian biathlete 
Henry Wilhelm Kristiansen,  Norwegian newspaper editor and Communist Party politician (1902-1942)
Ingrid Kristiansen, Norwegian long distance runner
Jan Kristiansen, Danish footballer
Jan Arne Kristiansen, rock musician with the band Raga Rockers
Jeanett Kristiansen, Norwegian handball player
John 'Tune' Kristiansen  Danish soccer manager
Kåre Kristiansen, Norwegian politician
Kjartan Kristiansen,  Norwegian rock musician
Kjeld Kirk Kristiansen,  Danish businessman, former CEO of LEGO (1979-2004)
Lyle Kristiansen (1939-2015), Canadian politician from British Columbia
Magne Kristiansen, American engineer
Sven Erik Kristiansen, Norwegian musician known as "Maniac", a black metal musician
Teddy Kristiansen, Danish comic book artist.

See also
Christensen
Christianson
Christiansen
Kristensen

Patronymic surnames
Danish-language surnames
Norwegian-language surnames
Surnames of Danish origin
Surnames of Norwegian origin
Surnames from given names